Jérôme Sanchez (born March 2, 1990) is a French professional basketball player for Stade Rochelais of the LNB Pro B.

Sanchez signed with Boulazac on June 17, 2015. He re-signed with the team on July 13, 2017.

References

External links
Eurobasket profile

1990 births
Living people
ASVEL Basket players
Boulazac Basket Dordogne players
Forwards (basketball)
French men's basketball players
JL Bourg-en-Bresse players
People from Vénissieux
Sportspeople from Lyon Metropolis